SpongeBob SquarePants: The Yellow Avenger is a SpongeBob video game developed by Tantalus Media and published by THQ for Nintendo DS and PlayStation Portable. It is the first SpongeBob game to be released on both consoles.

Plot
SpongeBob acquires Mermaid Man's powers when he wears his belt. Unfortunately SpongeBob accidentally puts the Dirty Bubble into a washing machine with the belt, which causes him to split into countless dirty bubbles. SpongeBob has to stop villains such as Man Ray, The Sinister Slug, Jumbo Shrimp, Atomic Flounder, and the Dirty Bubble, using Mermaid Man's powers to save Bikini Bottom. The story is divided into Acts, each with a different villain trying to wreak havoc on Bikini Bottom: Man Ray wants to flood Goo Lagoon; Sinister Slug has an evil plan to stop the talent show; Jumbo Shrimp, with the help of Plankton, creates a machine to shrink people; The Atomic Flounder causes chaos in Industrial Park; and The Dirty Bubble returns with the machine the Jumbo Shrimp used in the third act. He plans to hit SpongeBob with more Little Dirty Bubbles.

Reception

On the review-aggregating website Metacritic, the DS version has a 67 percent score, indicating "Mixed or average reviews", while the PSP version has a 48 percent, indicating "Generally unfavorable reviews".

Ed Lewis of IGN praised the graphics and music of the PSP version, but criticized its "sparse and uninspired" sound effects, as well as, "Confusing menus, lack of guidance, and the creepiest loading screen that's been seen in a long, long while." Lewis also criticized the repetitive gameplay, writing, "If the levels were linear and you went through the game once these would be a fun challenge, but there's lots and lots and lots of backtracking involved and much of it can't be skipped."

Marc Nix of IGN wrote a positive review of the DS version, favorably comparing gameplay to Indiana Jones and the Fate of Atlantis for its "unique mix of action and exploring." Nix called the game "a visual treat" and praised it for utilizing the system's touchscreen to creatively interact with objects. However, Nix criticized the game for some difficult gameplay and for not utilizing voice-overs from the stars of the television series.

Louis Bedigian of GameZone criticized the PSP version, writing that its worlds "feel empty" and that the game would only appeal to "kids with patience, kids who aren't bored by running and jumping in a bland environment." Bedigian praised some of the graphics, but criticized the game's long and repetitive loading times: "At least three of my first 15 minutes with this game were reserved for load times. That's potentially 12 minutes of loading for every hour of gameplay." Bedigian enjoyed the game's story but criticized the lack of voice-overs: "Without voice-overs, and with bland objectives that aren't overly fun, mission explanations are told through text. Lengthy, uninviting paragraphs that will surely turn off the game's target audience."

Anise Hollingshead of GameZone wrote a positive review of the DS version, praising its humor, its voiceovers, its use of the DS touchscreen, and its graphics, writing that it "is drawn exactly like the TV show." Hollingshead noted that the addition of minigames would have increased the game's overall enjoyment and replayability, but wrote, "Exploration and conversation are what players will experience the most, which is a welcomed change from most handheld games. It’s fun to just explore with SpongeBob and talk to his silly friends."

References

External links
 http://www.gamefaqs.com/portable/ds/file/929563/42313
 http://ds.ign.com/objects/682/682872.html
 http://www.expotv.com/videos/reviews/22/198/SpongebobSquarepantsTheYellowAvenge/137513

2005 video games
Nintendo DS games
PlayStation Portable games
The Yellow Avenger
Video games developed in Australia
THQ games
Platform games
Video games with 2.5D graphics
Tantalus Media games
Multiplayer and single-player video games